Julia Zaher is an Israeli Arab businessperson, philanthropist, and former schoolteacher. She is owner and CEO of Al Arz Tahini, a tahini manufacturing company. She is known for her philanthropic actions to benefit women's rights, people with disabilities, and LGBT health.

Career 
Zaher's family background is Arab Christian. She was a schoolteacher for decades before taking over Al Arz Tahini, her husband's tahini company in 2003. Upon taking over the company, Zaher paid off its debts and upgraded the manufacturing process. Al Arz's two factories produce 20 to 25 tons of tahini a day. The products are sold in Israel and exported to 18 countries. Zaher is the only Arab female factory owner in Israel. She is an advocate for diversity and women in the workplace. Her company employs a large number of Arab women in addition to Jewish, Muslim, and Christian residents from Jezreel Valley.

Zaher is recognized for her philanthropy. She has donated towards women's rights and people with disabilities. In 2020, she donated to The Aguda – Israel's LGBT Task Force to establish a crisis hotline for LGBT Arabic-speaking Israelis. Zaher was lauded by several politicians and LGBT rights activists and criticized for the donation, with critics claiming the action may lead to "normalization" of an LGBT lifestyle. The donation sparked a boycott of her company among social conservatives.

Personal life 
Zaher is from Nazareth and has two children. Her husband died from a heart attack in 2003.

References 

Living people
Year of birth missing (living people)
Place of birth missing (living people)
21st-century Israeli businesswomen
21st-century Israeli businesspeople
Arab citizens of Israel
Israeli philanthropists
Women philanthropists
People from Nazareth
Israeli women's rights activists
Israeli women activists
Israeli disability rights activists
Israeli LGBT rights activists
Israeli women chief executive officers
Businesspeople in the food industry
Chief executives in the manufacturing industry
20th-century Israeli educators
Israeli schoolteachers
20th-century women educators
Women civil rights activists